Twenty Good Years is an American sitcom television series created by Michael Leeson and Marsh McCall, that aired on NBC from October 11, 2006, until November 1, 2006. The series starred Jeffrey Tambor, John Lithgow, Heather Burns and Jake Sandvig.

Synopsis
John Lithgow plays John Mason, a surgeon forced into semi-retirement, while Jeffrey Tambor was Jeffrey Pyne, a judge. The comedy show was about two old friends that appeared to be polar opposites in many situations. One thing they agreed upon, however, is that life is short and both men vowed to live every day like it is their last, since they figured at their age, they only had "twenty good years" to live.

On May 14, 2007, the series was officially canceled by NBC.

Cast
John Lithgow as John Mason
Jeffrey Tambor as Jeffrey Pyne
Heather Burns as Stella Mason
Jake Sandvig as Hugh Pyne

Ratings and reception
Since the series debut, Twenty Good Years had been plagued by schedule changes before the season began, as well as receiving mixed-to-negative reviews. It had also placed fourth in its Wednesday time period and continued to slip since the first episode. On October 25, 2006, NBC announced that it was replacing the Wednesday night comedy block with specials, pulling Twenty Good Years from the schedule with no plans for a return.

Episodes

International broadcasts

References

External links 
 

2006 American television series debuts
2006 American television series endings
2000s American sitcoms
English-language television shows
NBC original programming
Television shows set in New York City
Television series by Warner Bros. Television Studios